Bruno Hirata Kaimoti (born March 13, 1988) is a Brazilian baseball catcher. He plays for the Toshiba club in the Japanese Industrial League. He represented Brazil at the 2008 Americas Baseball Cup and the 2013 World Baseball Classic.

References

External links
Baseball America

1988 births
2013 World Baseball Classic players
Brazilian expatriate baseball players in Japan
Brazilian people of Japanese descent
Living people
Sportspeople from São Paulo (state)